11-Eicosenoic acid, also called gondoic acid, is a monounsaturated omega-9 fatty acid found in a variety of plant oils and nuts; in particular jojoba oil. It is one of a number of eicosenoic acids.

References

Fatty acids
Alkenoic acids